De Afrekening is a Belgian radio and record chart broadcasting program featured on Studio Brussel (commonly referred to as "StuBru"). During the program, thirty top-rating "alternative" tracks are played, with the chart being assembled by the program's audience via a voting poll system. Two or three times each year, StuBru will release an album featuring the program's most popular chart tracks.  Beginning in 1990, albums are still released today and continue to prove popular with fans.

Since the chart is assembled via voting, unexpected results and outcomes will sometimes occur. One such instance occurred on 19 April 2006, with two separate songs placing first after receiving an equal number of votes. The songs in question were Placebo's "Song to Say Goodbye," and A Brand's "Hammerhead". Another historical event occurred on 31 May 2006. For the first time ever, a song featured on the annual Eurovision Song Contest entered the charts. This song was Lordi's "Hard Rock Hallelujah."

At the end of each year, the most popular songs of that year is assembled. This chart is known as the "Eindafrekening," or by its nickname "De Afvaardiging."

The chart is also broadcast on TMF Flanders

The Final Settlement ("De Eindafrekening")
Since 1985, listeners of De Afrekening have voted for the Eindafrekening every year. The Eindafrekening has had nine Belgian winners with The Scabs (1990), dEUS (1995, 1996, 1999 and 2008), K's Choice (1998), A Brand (2006), Milow (2007), Customs (2009), The Van Jets (2010), Oscar and the Wolf (2014) and Bazart (2016). Only R.E.M. (1989 and 1991), dEUS (1995, 1996, 1999 and 2008), Muse (2003 and 2015) and Tool (2001 and 2019) have won  more than once.

The Ultimate Final Settlement ("De Ultieme Eindafrekening")
To celebrate 35 years De Afrekening, listeners voted for the De Ultieme Eindafrekening from the previous winners.

See also
 3VOOR12

References

External links
De Afrekening

Belgian record charts
Music chart shows